"A Mess of Blues" is a song originally recorded by Elvis Presley for RCA Records in 1960, and written by Doc Pomus and Mort Shuman. Although released as the B-side to "It's Now or Never", "A Mess of Blues" reached number 32 in the U.S. and number 2 in the UK independently.

The song was published by Elvis Presley Music, Inc.

The recording appeared on the 1968 RCA Victor compilation Elvis' Gold Records Volume 4.

Personnel
Sourced from Keith Flynn.

The Blue Moon Boys
 Elvis Presley - lead vocals, acoustic rhythm guitar
 Scotty Moore - lead guitar
 D. J. Fontana - drums
Additional musicians
 Hank Garland - bass guitar
 Bob Moore - double bass
 Floyd Cramer - piano
 Buddy Harman - drums
 The Jordanaires - backing vocals

Status Quo cover 

"A Mess of Blues" was covered by British rock band Status Quo in 1983. It was included on the album Back to Back from which it was the second UK single, reaching a peak position of No. 15.

Due to a printing error, several hundred copies of the picture sleeve for this release were printed with the front and rear photographs inter-changed.

Track listing

7" single 
 "A Mess of Blues" (D Pomus/M Shuman) (3.22)
 "Big Man" (Lancaster/Green) (3.40)

12" single 
 "A Mess of Blues" (Extended version) (D Pomus/M Shuman) (4.48)
 "Big Man" (Lancaster/Green) (3.40)
 "Young Pretender" (Rossi/Frost) (3.32)

Other versions
The song has been recorded by Tom Jones and Jools Holland, Peter and Gordon, John Hiatt, Jeff Healey, Alexis Korner, Delbert McClinton, Lee Curtis and the All-Stars, Henry McCullough Blues Band, Scotty Moore and Paul Ansell, Robert Gordon and Chris Spedding with The Jordanaires, P.J. Proby, Chris Wilson, and Led Zeppelin as part of a medley.

Chart history 
Elvis Presley

Status Quo

References 

1960 singles
Elvis Presley songs
1983 singles
Status Quo (band) songs
Songs with music by Mort Shuman
Songs with lyrics by Doc Pomus
1960 songs
RCA Victor singles
Vertigo Records singles